Boundary Pillar railway station (Balochi: باؤنڈری پلر ریلوے اسٹیشن) is the border station between Iran and Pakistan.

See also
 List of railway stations in Pakistan
 Pakistan Railways

References

External links

Iran–Pakistan border
Railway stations on Quetta–Taftan Railway Line
Railway stations in Balochistan, Pakistan